The following is a list of notable paintball markers that have been, or are currently manufactured - ordered by manufacture in alphabetical order.

Hopper-fed markers

Pump & Stock Class markers

Pump markers are manually actuated between shots. Stock class markers substitute constant-air for a 12-gram powerlet and hopper for a feed tube.

Magazine-fed markers

Magazine designs include the RAP4/Tacamo (more-or-less interchangeable), Dye DAM mag and Kingman mag.

|–
| MILSIG
| M17A2/ CQC
| Semi-Automatic
|
| 0.68
|
| MILSIG 12–20 rnd Magazine
|–
| Tippmann
| TMC
| Semi-Automatic
|
| 0.68
|
|

Pistols

Pistols are designed to be fired one-handed. They are almost always magazine-fed and powered by 12-gram CO2 cartridges, though hopper and constant-air adapters may be available.

Human-powered

.50 cal is common among low-cost mass-produced designs, as the projectiles only require ~1/3 as much energy to fire, compared to .68 cal.

References

External links
 An attempt of an almost complete listing of all paintball markers ever appeared on the market (German)
 List of Top Rated Paintball Markers
 List of Paintball Markers

Paintball markers